Amphilecta is a genus of flies in the family Stratiomyidae.

Species
Amphilecta superba Brauer, 1882

References

Stratiomyidae
Brachycera genera
Taxa named by Friedrich Moritz Brauer
Diptera of South America